Barry Scott may refer to:

 Barry Scott (actor) (1955–2020), American actor and voice-over artist
 Barry Scott (cricketer) (1916–1984), Australian cricketer
 Barry Scott (Cillit Bang), an advertising character
 Barry Scott (geneticist), Fellow of the Royal Society Te Apārangi
 Barry Scott, lead vocalist of Barry Scott & Second Wind